Miss Piccolo (German: Fräulein Piccolo) is a 1914 German silent comedy film directed by Franz Hofer and starring Dorrit Weixler, Ernst Lubitsch and Alice Hechy.

The film's sets were designed by the art director Fritz Kraenke.

Cast
 Dorrit Weixler as Lo - Fräulein Piccolo 
 Ernst Lubitsch as Pinkeles 
 Franz Schwaiger as Leutnant Clairon 
 Alice Hechy as Röschen  
 Max Lehmann as Los Vater 
 Karl Harbacher as Kellner
 Helene Voß as Los Mutter
 Martin Wolff
 Grete Weixler

References

Bibliography
 Bock, Hans-Michael & Bergfelder, Tim. The Concise CineGraph. Encyclopedia of German Cinema. Berghahn Books, 2009.

External links

1914 films
1914 comedy films
German comedy films
Films of the German Empire
German silent feature films
Films directed by Franz Hofer
German black-and-white films
Films set in hotels
Cross-dressing in film
Silent comedy films
1910s German films